Elizabeth Wilson (1921–2015) was an American actress.

Elizabeth Wilson (or variants) may also refer to:

Characters
Liz Wilson, fictional character in Garfield
Elizabeth (Harriot) Wilson (c. 1762–1786), figure in the folklore of southeastern Pennsylvania

Others
Lady Elizabeth Wilson (1907–2008), Australian activist
Bettie Wilson (1890–2006), American supercentenarian
Betty Wilson (1921–2010), cricketer
Betty Wilson (politician) (born 1932), American politician in New Jersey
Betty Wilson, final victim of serial killer Richard Laurence Marquette
Elizabeth Wilson (author) (born 1936), feminist independent researcher and writer
Elizabeth Wilson (doctor) (1926–2016), family planning physician and right to die campaigner
Elizabeth A. Wilson, professor of women’s, gender, and sexuality studies
Elizabeth Wilson (screenwriter) (1914–2000), American screenwriter

See also
Beth Wilson (disambiguation)